Laura Ashley Samuels is an American actress. She is best known for playing Courtney on Awkward, Beth on Modern Family and Pfeiffer on Lopez.

Samuels has also appeared in films such as The Final (2010), In Time (2011), Dumbbells (2014), and Walk of Fame (2017).

Career
Samuels began her acting career in 2010 with the role, Kelli in the horror film, The Final. She followed with guest appearances on American teen sitcoms, True Jackson, VP and Wizards of Waverly Place. In 2011, she starred in the action thriller film, In Time alongside Justin Timberlake, Amanda Seyfried and Olivia Wilde, as Sagita and also guest starred in the teen drama, 90210.

In 2012, Samuels starred in three episodes of Awkward. as high school freshman, Courtney. She also starred in the comedy film, Dumbbells as Candy, and had a guest appearance in an episode of Raising Hope as Abigail.

In 2015, Samuels starred in five episodes of Modern Family as Beth, U.S. Coast Guard and ex-fiancée of Andy Bailey, played by Adam DeVine. In 2017, she had a lead role in the comedy film, Walk of Fame with Scott Eastwood and Cory Hardrict as ex-flight attendant, Nikki. She also starred in six episodes of Lopez as Olly's younger sister, Pfeiffer, and starred in an episode of Workaholics.

Samuels starred in the comedy film, 1 Night in San Diego as Brooklyn, alongside Alexandra Daddario, Jenna Ushkowitz and Eric Nelsen. The film was released on November 17, 2020.

Filmography

Film

Television

References

External links
 

20th-century American actresses
21st-century American actresses
Actresses from Texas
American film actresses
American television actresses
Living people
People from Prosper, Texas
Year of birth missing (living people)